Like a Rose may refer to:

Like a Rose (album) by Ashley Monroe
"Like a Rose" (song) by A1